Steve Smith is an American politician and a former Republican member of the Arizona Senate representing District 11 since 2015 to 2019. He previously represented the 11th district in the House from 2013 to 2015, and District 23 seat in the Senate from 2011 to 2013.

Early life and education
Smith was born in Detroit, Michigan. He earned his BA in marketing from Michigan State University. He moved to Arizona in 2001.

Elections
In 2010, Smith challenged incumbent Democratic State Senator Rebecca Rios for the District 23 seat. Smith won the August 24, 2010, Republican primary with 11,719 votes (74.4%); and defeated Rios in the November 2, 2010, general election with 34,568 votes.

In 2012, incumbent Republican State Senator Michele Reagan was redistricted from District 8 and State Representatives Eric Meyer and Kate Brophy McGee were redistricted to District 28. Smith declared his candidacy for House District 11. In the August 28, 2012, Republican primary, he placed first with 16,201 votes, and won the three-way November 6, 2012, general election with 44,928 votes against Democratic nominee Dave Joseph.

In 2014, Smith defeated Democrat Jo Holton in the November 4 general election.

In 2016, Smith was unopposed in the Republican primary. He defeated Democratic nominee Ralph Atchue in the general election.

The Goldwater Institute gave him a 69% evaluation in 2013. The American Conservative Union gave him a 95% evaluation in 2017.

Personal life 
Smith is married to his wife Jamie, and they have five children. Smith is a Christian.

Electoral history

References

External links
 Official page at the Arizona State Legislature
 Historic page from his Arizona Senate term
 Campaign site
 

Place of birth missing (living people)
Year of birth missing (living people)
Living people
Republican Party Arizona state senators
Republican Party members of the Arizona House of Representatives
Michigan State University alumni
People from Pinal County, Arizona
21st-century American politicians